Lucie Cheng was a sociologist known for her work in Asian American studies, as well as being the first permanent director of the Asian American Studies Center, UCLA. She was also one of the first American academics to forge links with mainland Chinese academic institutions after the formalisation of Sino-US relations.

Early life
Cheng was born to journalist Cheng Shewo and Hsiao Tsung-jang (蕭宗讓) in Hong Kong during the Second Sino-Japanese War. As a result of her father's job, Cheng moved frequently with her family during her youth to Guilin, Chongqing, and Beiping. After the end of the war, the family returned to Hong Kong, though Cheng's older brother later returned to People's Republic of China to help with the socialist movement. In 1952, the family moved Cheng and her elder sister Catherine Chia-lin Cheng (成嘉玲）to Taiwan.

Education
Cheng attended the prestigious Taipei First Girls' High School, before joining the Department for Foreign Languages at National Taiwan University. In her second year, Cheng studied abroad in the Music Department of University of Hawaii, despite her father's objections. During her stay, Cheng worked as a babysitter for a wealthy American family; the experience piqued her interest in class stratification. She then went on to obtain an MA in Sociology from the university and an MA in library studies at the University of Chicago, before completing her PhD at the University of Hawaii in 1970.

Career

United States
Cheng became assistant professor of sociology at UCLA in 1970. Due to her engagements with politics and student movements, she became director of UCLA's Asian American Studies Center; the first permanent director since the center was founded in 1969. Cheng developed and expanded the centre, employing some of its major scholars, like Valerie Matsumoto, Robert A. Nakamura, and Russell Leong. Under Cheng, the center was run according to socialist principles, with students and teachers rejecting hierarchical structures considered typical in capitalist America.

In 1978, alongside the Chinese Historical Society of Southern California, Cheng organised the 'Southern California Chinese American Oral History Project'. The project focussed on oral testimonies of history by grassroots Chinese Americans, encouraging them to engage with cultural struggles both in China and America.

After the normalisation of Sino-US relations in 1979, Cheng visited a Chinese university with other members of UCLA, becoming one of the first academic parties to visit the mainland. Cheng had, however, visited the Chinese mainland throughout the 1970s in a person capacity, searching for her brother and sister on her father's behalf. During one visit, she met with Zhou Enlai, who informed her that her father was no longer considered an enemy by the Communist Part.

In 1985, Cheng founded the Center of Pacific Rim Studies at UCLA, for research on regions typically on the borders of other studies.

Taiwan
Cheng assumed management of her father's Taiwan-based paper, the Li pao, in 1991 and continued to support leftist perspectives. She then divided her time between the United States and Taiwan, teaching at Shih Hsin University, before becoming a professor there in 1993, when she founded a course on gender and development.

In 2006, she founded Sifang pao, a paper aimed at Vietnamese and Thai immigrants and migrant workers.

Honours
2011 35th Golden Tripod Award - special contribution.
The Lucie Cheng Prize is awarded by the Amerasia Journal, and recognises outstanding student essays in Asian American and Pacific Islander Studies.

Selected works

Books

Articles

References

1939 births
2010 deaths
American Marxists
Taiwanese Marxists
Chinese women sociologists
Hong Kong emigrants to Taiwan
National Taiwan University alumni
Academic staff of Shih Hsin University
University of California, Los Angeles faculty
University of Chicago alumni
University of Hawaiʻi at Mānoa alumni